SP-171  is a state highway in the state of São Paulo in Brazil. It is 70 km (43 miles) long, and has two official names: Paul Virginio and Salvador Pancetti.

References

Highways in São Paulo (state)